A tombstone promotion is an advance in rank awarded at retirement. It often does not include any corresponding increase in retired pay, in which case it is an honorary promotion whose only benefit is the right to be addressed by the higher rank and to carve it on one's tombstone.

The term was originally coined to describe the one-grade retirement promotion authorized for United States Navy line officers in 1899 to induce aging American Civil War veterans to make way for younger officers. This type of tombstone promotion included both the rank and retired pay of the higher grade, to encourage early retirements that would help flatten the so-called "hump" of excess officers who were recruited during a wartime expansion and then clogged the peacetime promotion flow after the postwar cutbacks that followed the Civil War and World War I.

Tombstone promotions can provide extra incentive for officers to complete a full career in a community too small to afford the flag rank opportunities available in the wider service. Until 1925, a lieutenant in a Navy staff corps could retire as a commodore after 40 years of service. Honorary tombstone promotions are still granted for this reason to long-serving permanent professors at the U.S. Military Academy and U.S. Air Force Academy, and to assistant judge advocates general of the Navy.

Tombstone promotions have also been granted to honor exceptional individual service, such as building the Panama Canal or commendable performance in actual combat. From 1925 to 1959, thousands of United States Navy, Marine Corps, Coast Guard, and Coast and Geodetic Survey officers retired with honorary one-grade promotions on the basis of combat citations awarded before the end of World War II. By May 29, 1959, 1,222 of the 1,420 retired Navy rear admirals—86 percent—had never served in that grade on active duty, being captains who retired with an honorary promotion to flag rank and the derisive nickname of "tombstone admiral".

United States armed services

Civil War hump

Promotion stagnation

After the Civil War, promotions stagnated in the Navy because too many officers were recruited during the war, rose to higher grades at a relatively young age, and remained in the service until retirement, creating a "hump" of officers who were disproportionately trapped in lower grades and would be promoted by seniority to command rank too late in their careers to be effective. For example, French E. Chadwick was commissioned ensign in 1866 and spent only a year as a lieutenant before being promoted to lieutenant commander in 1869 at the age of 25, but George P. Colvocoresses, who received his commission only four years after Chadwick, was a 50-year-old lieutenant when he was finally promoted in 1897 after 22 years in grade.

To flatten the hump, a board chaired by Naval Academy superintendent Robert L. Phythian recommended in 1891 that officers in excess of the desired grade distribution be allowed to retire with the rank and retired pay of the next highest grade. Tombstone promotions as retirement incentive had been suggested as early as 1842, when the Senate Naval Affairs Committee proposed that senior captains, commanders, and lieutenants be encouraged to retire voluntarily by giving them the rank and half pay of the next higher grade. A decade later, the outgoing secretary of the Navy recommended compelling officers to retire for age or incapacity, with an honorary one-rank promotion to soften the blow. The Phythian Board's report eventually led Congress to tie a tombstone promotion to the Navy's first "plucking" board in 1899.

1899 Navy personnel act
The Navy personnel act of 1899 was a sweeping reform designed to revitalize the officer corps, especially at command ranks, by weeding out superannuated Civil War veterans. Line officers in the grades of captain, commander, and lieutenant commander could retire with the rank and three-fourths the sea pay of the next higher grade if they were selected—"plucked"—by a board for involuntary retirement. House Naval Affairs Committee member Amos J. Cummings drew an analogy to Army officers who were retired in the next higher grade if discovered to be physically disqualified by an examination for promotion to that grade. "These officers are sacrificed for the benefit of the service. It is fair that this slight recompense should be made for their involuntary retirement."

Since the point of the law was to open more vacancies to which junior officers could be promoted by seniority, Congress offered the same tombstone promotion to officers who retired voluntarily. "If we did not do it we would have very few applicants for retirement," said House Naval Affairs Committee chairman George E. Foss. "There must be an incentive for voluntary retirement."

In addition, any Navy officer with a creditable record that included service during the Civil War could retire with the rank and three-fourths the sea pay of the next higher grade. A captain retired as a rear admiral if his tombstone promotion was for Civil War service, but as a commodore if it was for voluntary or involuntary retirement, even though the same act abolished that grade on the active list.

Neither plucking board nor tombstone promotion substantially flattened the promotion hump, and promotion by seniority continued to advance officers very close to retirement age. When rear admiral Robert M. Berry reached the mandatory retirement age of 62, the senior captain was Harrison G. O. Colby, who happened to have been born on the same day. Berry and Colby both retired for age on January 28, 1908—Colby in the grade of captain with a tombstone promotion to rear admiral for Civil War service—and the second-ranking captain, Leavitt C. Logan, was promoted to rear admiral only two days before retiring for age himself on January 30.

Congress repealed the 1899 tombstone promotion for all but Civil War veterans in 1912, specifying that Navy officers who applied for voluntary retirement or were selected for involuntary retirement would have the rank and three-fourths the sea pay of the grade from which retired, instead of the next higher grade. The root causes of the promotion hump were not resolved until the late 1910s, when Congress replaced promotion by seniority with promotion by selection, and provided different mandatory retirement ages for each grade.

One-day generals

The Army, which had its own Civil War hump to flatten, created the equivalent of a tombstone promotion by advancing officers shortly before they retired, often with only a single day in the higher grade. In 1894, Frank Wheaton was promoted to major general ahead of John R. Brooke, a senior but younger brigadier general, because Wheaton would retire for age only a month later. Brooke finally became a major general after another two junior but older brigadier generals, James W. Forsyth and Zenas R. Bliss, were promoted ahead of him on condition that each apply to retire after a week. The four brigadier generalcies vacated by Wheaton, Forsyth, Bliss, and Brooke were filled by six colonels, two of whom also retired almost immediately, setting a pattern for the future. Between the end of the Spanish–American War and August 1901, twenty-three more colonels were promoted to brigadier general and promptly retired.

Navy officers made similar pacts to retire more officers in flag grades. In 1883, Asiatic Station commander Peirce Crosby agreed to step down a few months early so Alexander C. Rhind could be promoted to rear admiral the day before reaching retirement age. The Asiatic Station lost another commander in July 1894 when Joseph S. Skerrett retired early to vacate his rear admiralcy for the senior commodore, Joseph P. Fyffe, who retired for age a few days later and was succeeded by Oscar F. Stanton, who also retired early after a few days, clearing the path for Henry Erben to be rear admiral for the five weeks until his statutory retirement in September.

In early 1903, the Senate passed an amendment to give Army officers with at least one year of service during the Civil War a similar tombstone promotion as provided in 1899 for Civil War veterans in the Navy, but the House rejected it. Undeterred, the War Department continued the administration's policy of rewarding Civil War veterans with more than 40 years of service by promoting them to brigadier general before they retired. From 1903 to 1906, another sixty-two colonels were promoted to brigadier general and retired after only one day in grade, including three weeks in 1903 when thirty-four colonels were promoted and retired at the rate of one or two a day. Even after Congress provided a one-grade tombstone promotion for all Army officers with Civil War service in 1904, the administration continued to nominate one-day generals, dipping into the ranks of lieutenant colonels and even a major, in the case of John L. Bullis.

Congress finally required in 1906 that general officers serve at least one year in grade before retiring for reasons other than age or disability. This largely ended the succession of one-day generals, except for occasional coincidences of age and deliberate promotions of incapacitated officers. For example, major general Adolphus W. Greely's 1908 retirement triggered a chain of promotions that elevated Charles Morris to brigadier general two days before he retired for age. In November 1923, brigadier generals Harry H. Bandholtz and William H. Hay were each promoted to major general and immediately retired for disability; Bandholtz had collapsed from heart problems in April and Hay was recovering from an automobile accident the previous year.

Civil War veterans
The 1904 Army appropriation act authorized Army officers who had served in the Civil War to retire with the rank and retired pay of the next higher grade, if they were below the grade of brigadier general and retired for disability, age, or after 40 years of service. All Navy and Marine Corps officers meeting those criteria were granted the same tombstone promotion in 1906, as were Revenue Cutter Service officers in 1908.

In 1907, Army brigadier generals who held that rank for at least three years and had served in the Civil War were allowed to retire with the rank and retired pay of major general.

World War I hump
The massive World War I expansion and postwar drawdown of the Army and Navy created a new hump of excess officers in lower grades, which both services tried to flatten by again offering tombstone promotions for voluntary retirements, and also restricting length of service in each grade to force involuntary retirements.

In 1935, Congress invited Army officers below the grade of major, who had served during World War I and now had 15 to 29 years of service, to retire voluntarily in the grade of major. By 1940, the World War I hump had advanced into field grades, so the tombstone promotion was updated to allow officers who served during World War I to retire in the grade of lieutenant colonel if they had 23 to 28 years of service, or colonel if more than 28 years, and failed to reach those grades due to length-of-service restrictions.

Congress gave a similar tombstone promotion to the Navy in 1938, authorizing lieutenants with 21 years of service to retire in the grade of lieutenant commander if they served in the Navy or Naval Reserve Force during World War I.

Building the Panama Canal

Following the completion of the Panama Canal in 1914, Congress authorized Army and Navy officers who had served more than three years with the Isthmian Canal Commission to be advanced one grade in rank upon retirement. Under this provision, Edgar Jadwin retired as a lieutenant general in 1929 and James F. Leys as a vice admiral in 1932, the first Army engineer and first Navy surgeon, respectively, to achieve three-star rank.

The Comptroller General ruled Jadwin was entitled to the retired pay of a lieutenant general since several retired lieutenant generals had continued to draw pensions even after the grade was abolished on the active list in 1907. However, the same Comptroller General denied Leys the retired pay of a vice admiral, on the grounds that the grade had been abolished in 1890 and all subsequent vice admirals actually held the grade of rear admiral with only the temporary rank of vice admiral, so the grade of vice admiral did not exist. The Court of Claims overturned this decision and gave Leys the retired pay of a vice admiral.

Navy staff corps officers with 40 years of service
In 1877, Navy officers of the Medical, Pay, and Engineer Corps, chaplains, professors of mathematics, and naval constructors were authorized to retire with the relative rank but not the pay of a commodore, if they retired after 45 years of service, or at the age of 62 after at least 40 years of service. This was meant to reward long service in a staff corps with a higher rank on the retired list than could be attained on the active list, since the only staff corps officers with ranks higher than captain were the bureau chiefs. Staff corps officers continued to retire with the rank of commodore even after the grade was abolished in 1899. In 1916, the rank of rear admiral was established on the active list for all staff corps officers except chaplains and professors of mathematics, weakening the original rationale for this promotion by making flag rank more attainable. The retirement age was increased to 64 and staff corps officers were given the pay of their rank, so officers who retired with the rank of commodore now received its retired pay as well.

A staff corps officer's right to retire as a commodore could even survive the demise of his staff corps. In 1925, retired line officer Frank W. Bartlett, originally an officer in the Engineer Corps, successfully argued that he should have been retired as a commodore instead of a captain, even though he had transferred to the line along with the rest of the Engineer Corps in 1899.

Lieutenants retired as commodores

Although intended for captains, the wording of the law allowed staff corps officers of any rank to retire as a commodore after enough years of service. In 1913, two civilian professors at the Naval Academy, Nathaniel M. Terry and W. Woolsey Johnson, were commissioned by special act of Congress in the grade of professor of mathematics with the rank of lieutenant. When Terry retired in 1917, his combined service as civilian professor and commissioned officer in the Corps of Professors of Mathematics exceeded 45 years, so he was placed on the retired list with the rank of commodore and a pay raise, since the retired pay of a commodore exceeded his active-duty pay as a lieutenant. Johnson received the same four-grade promotion from lieutenant to commodore when he retired in 1921.

Two lieutenants in the Pay Corps and Construction Corps were promoted to commodore when they retired after more than 40 years of mostly enlisted service. After 38 years as a paymaster's clerk or chief pay clerk, Edward F. Delaney received an emergency commission during World War I as an assistant paymaster with the rank of ensign, rising to passed assistant paymaster with the rank of lieutenant by 1922, when he retired at the age of 64 with a promotion to commodore. Ellis W. Craig was commissioned as a naval constructor with the rank of lieutenant in 1921 and retired as a commodore in 1924, after only 3 years as a commissioned officer and 39 years as an enlisted man, warrant officer, or chief warrant officer. The Comptroller General of the United States argued that the law "was not designed to establish the military monstrosity of requiring the promotion to the flag rank of commodore of one who had served practically all his career in the Navy in a grade ranking with but after ensign" and tried to void both promotions, but was overruled by the Court of Claims.

After the Attorney General of the United States confirmed that Terry was entitled to his tombstone promotion, the Navy began appealing for Congress to stop lieutenants from retiring as commodores. In 1925, Congress closed the loophole by specifying that only captains could retire as commodores. The law was repealed altogether in 1926 except for the Corps of Professors of Mathematics, which was scheduled to dissolve when its last commissioned professor retired, since new appointments in that corps had been halted in 1916. The Officer Personnel Act of 1947 repealed this law even for professors of mathematics, all of whom were long since retired.

Marine Corps colonels with 40 years of service

The 1916 naval appropriation act authorized Marine Corps colonels to retire as brigadier generals after 45 years of service, or after 40 years of service if they retired at age 64, mirroring the tombstone promotion to commodore in Navy staff corps.

No Marine Corps colonel then on the active list had served long enough to qualify for this promotion yet, but a number of senior Army colonels did have more than 40 years of service already. Army chief of staff Hugh L. Scott asked Congress to give the same promotion to the Army, since "otherwise the Army becomes the object of comparison with what may seem to be the more favored branch of Congress". Instead, the 1917 naval appropriation act simply withdrew the tombstone promotion from the Marine Corps, only nine months after it was extended.

Coast Guard officers with 40 years of service
In 1923, Coast Guard officers with 40 years of service were authorized to retire with the rank and retired pay of the next higher grade. For captains, the next higher grade for this purpose was commodore, until it was changed retroactively to rear admiral (lower half) in 1937.

Like Navy staff corps during the nineteenth century, the Coast Guard was so small that its officers had little chance of reaching flag rank or even captain, so the promotion was meant as an incentive for officers to complete a full 40-year career. Flag grades did not exist in the Coast Guard, whose commandant held only the ex officio rank of rear admiral and reverted to his permanent grade of captain upon leaving office, so a tombstone promotion was the only way Coast Guard officers could retire with the same rank and pay as officers with comparable length of service in the much larger Navy.

Only 21 Coast Guard officers received this type of promotion. In 1947, flag grades were established in the Coast Guard, giving its officers the same promotion opportunities as their Navy counterparts, so at the Coast Guard's request, Congress repealed the 40-year tombstone promotion when it codified the various Coast Guard statutes into positive law in 1949.

Combat citations before the end of World War II

From 1925 to 1959, officers of the maritime services—Navy, Marine Corps, Coast Guard, and Coast and Geodetic Survey—could retire with a tombstone promotion to the rank but not the pay of the next higher grade, if they were specially commended for their performance of duty in actual combat before the end of World War II.

Retired officers who actually served in a grade while on active duty had precedence over those who advanced to that grade based on combat citations. Captains who only reached flag rank by retiring with an honorary combat citation promotion were derisively nicknamed "tombstone admirals".

Honorary tombstone promotions for combat citations produced the first four-star Marine, Thomas Holcomb; the first three-star dentist, Alexander G. Lyle; and the first three-star chaplain, Maurice S. Sheehy.

World War I
Tombstone promotions for combat citations were inspired by the case of Navy captain Douglas E. Dismukes, who faced mandatory retirement in 1925 because his age disqualified him from further consideration for promotion to rear admiral. Dismukes had commanded the transport Mount Vernon during World War I, and was decorated for saving the ship after it was torpedoed by a German submarine while returning to the United States with more than 1,600 passengers, including Minnesota congressman Thomas D. Schall.

Friends of Dismukes and Schall in the House and Senate introduced legislation to exempt Dismukes from the mandatory retirement law, but the Department of the Navy remained committed to its policy of retiring captains at age 56. Instead, Congress passed the so-called "Tombstone Law" that authorized Dismukes personally to be retired as a rear admiral, and provided more generally that all Navy and Marine Corps officers who were specially commended for their performance of duty in actual combat with the enemy during World War I, and who retired due to age ineligibility for promotion, would retire with three-fourths the retired pay of the grade from which retired, and the rank of the next higher grade.

Two years later, Congress had to pass another law to advance retired Navy captain Reginald R. Belknap to rear admiral on the retired list, since Belknap had retired for excessive time in grade, not age, and therefore did not qualify for the 1925 tombstone promotion. Congress extended tombstone promotion eligibility to cover retirement due to time in grade in 1931, and retirement due to physical disability in 1936.

World War II
Between 1938 and 1942, tombstone promotions for combat citations were expanded to include periods other than World War I, Navy and Marine Corps officers already retired, Navy staff corps officers, Naval and Marine Corps Reservists, and Coast Guard and Coast and Geodetic Survey officers.

In 1943, the Department of the Navy unsuccessfully asked Congress to restrict tombstone promotions to commendations awarded before the President declared a state of emergency on September 8, 1939, following the outbreak of World War II in Europe. Only 55 Navy and 38 Marine Corps officers had received tombstone promotions for commendations prior to that date, with 38 Navy and 77 Marine Corps officers still eligible. However, by January 26, 1943, another 2,000 officers had already been commended for actions since the attack on Pearl Harbor on December 7, 1941, along with 2,000 enlisted men who could qualify for a tombstone promotion if they ever became an officer. The Navy Department, which had always opposed the 1925 tombstone promotion law, worried that tombstone promotions would become the norm instead of the exception.

The Officer Personnel Act of 1947 consolidated all of the various tombstone promotion laws, and limited eligibility to combat citations awarded before the end of World War II, defined as December 31, 1946.

Grade at retirement

Tombstone promotions were based on an officer's grade on the day they actually retired. A vice admiral or lieutenant general could only receive a tombstone promotion to four-star admiral or general if he still held a three-star job when he retired, so when Marine Corps lieutenant general Oliver P. Smith was abruptly ordered to relinquish his three-star command on September 1, 1955, and revert to major general for the two months until his statutory retirement, he preserved his tombstone promotion to general by changing his retirement date to September 1.

Conversely, Navy vice admiral Gerald F. Bogan offended the secretary of the Navy during the so-called Revolt of the Admirals and was relieved of his three-star command on January 7, 1950, only three weeks before he was scheduled to retire with a tombstone promotion to admiral. Instead, he reverted to rear admiral and received a tombstone promotion back to vice admiral.

Exceptions to this rule were officers who held temporary grades during World War II. A 1946 law gave Navy, Marine Corps, and Coast Guard officers the retired pay as well as the rank of the highest temporary grade in which they had satisfactory service on or before June 30, 1946, which the Judge Advocate General of the Navy interpreted to mean an officer could apply his tombstone promotion to his highest temporary grade from World War II, instead of the grade he held when he retired. For example, Navy rear admiral David W. Bagley reverted from vice admiral to rear admiral after World War II, was restored to vice admiral when he retired on April 1, 1947, and received a tombstone promotion to admiral.

Retired pay
Although a tombstone promotion gave an officer only the rank of the next higher grade and not its retired pay, it could still increase the officer's retired pay if he retired with less than 30 years of service. Retired pay was computed by multiplying an officer's years of service by 2.5 percent of his highest active-duty pay, ranging from a minimum of 50 percent when an officer became eligible to retire after 20 years of service, to a maximum of 75 percent at 30 years. Until 1949, a tombstone promotion entitled an officer to retire with the 75 percent maximum after any length of service, making it possible to retire at 20 years with 75 percent pay instead of 50 percent.

The Career Compensation Act of 1949 gave all officers the same retired pay formula and repealed the 75 percent retired pay for a tombstone promotion, whose only remaining benefit was an honorary increase in rank.

Recall to active duty

Officers who retired with a tombstone promotion could be recalled to active duty in either the grade from which they retired, or their tombstone grade on the retired list. Starting in 1958, if recalled in their tombstone grade, officers became eligible for its retired pay after serving continuously in that grade for at least two years on active duty. For example, Marine Corps lieutenant general Gerald C. Thomas retired with a tombstone promotion to general on December 31, 1955, and was recalled to active duty in his tombstone grade to serve as staff director of the Net Evaluation Subcommittee of the National Security Council from April 1, 1956, to January 1, 1959, qualifying him after two years to be the first Marine other than former commandants to receive the retired pay of a general.

Coast Guard warrant officers
Tombstone promotions for combat citations were authorized for Coast Guard officers in 1942, and reauthorized in 1949 when the various statutes that governed the Coast Guard were codified into positive law. The 1949 law further provided that Coast Guard warrant officers who were specially commended for performance of duty in actual combat could retire with the grade of commissioned warrant officer and three-fourths the retired pay of a warrant officer. Subsequent legislation kept the tombstone promotion for Coast Guard officers and warrant officers in line with the Navy and Marine Corps, repealing its three-fourths retired pay in 1950, and the promotion itself in 1959.

Army and Air Force

An early draft of the Career Compensation Act of 1949 would have granted tombstone promotions in the Army for combat citations awarded up to December 31, 1946, the same as in the Navy. Army personnel chief John E. Dahlquist gave this expansion of the 1925 tombstone promotion law, disparagingly dubbed "the hero act", his unenthusiastic endorsement. "We have tried for years to get the hero act out. But if it is going to be continued, we must have it extended to the Army," he told a House subcommittee in 1949. "If we thought that we could abolish the hero act, we would like that best, but if we can't abolish it we must join them."

If the Army and Navy both got tombstone promotions, then the Air Force must have them too, said Air Force assistant personnel chief Richard E. Nugent, but equal treatment was better achieved by eliminating tombstone promotions altogether. The Air Force was adamantly opposed to adopting them itself, because the nature of air warfare during World War II gave only fliers the combat decorations needed for a tombstone promotion, unjustly discriminating against the half of all Air Force officers who had made an equal contribution as ground personnel.

The subcommittee deleted the provision from the final law, citing the administrative burden, expense, and inevitable controversy associated with retroactively assessing the tombstone promotion eligibility of all serving and retired Army and Air Force officers, as well as the fact that neither Army nor Air Force officials seemed to really want it. Asked how strenuously the other services would resist continuing tombstone promotions just for the Navy, Dahlquist shrugged, "Not strenuously. We think it is a poor law, but we are not going to worry about it."

"Tombstone promotion with pay"

Navy personnel officers claimed that the Army and Air Force already provided a "tombstone promotion with pay" by manipulating their dual promotion tracks for temporary and permanent grades. Since mandatory retirement laws were based on time in permanent grade but officers could retire in the highest temporary grade in which they served at least six months, the Army could deliberately promote a colonel to temporary brigadier general in his 29th year of service and then fail to select him for permanent brigadier general, forcing him to retire in his 30th year for excessive time in grade as a permanent colonel, but with the rank and retired pay of his highest temporary grade of brigadier general. The equivalent Navy captain also retired in his 30th year, but could receive a tombstone promotion to only the rank of rear admiral and not its retired pay.

For example, Army officer John G. Hill graduated from the United States Military Academy in 1924 and was selected for temporary brigadier general in 1953, confirmed by the Senate in January 1954, and retired in that grade seven months later, after 30 years of service. Navy officer Eugene T. Seaward graduated from the United States Naval Academy, also in 1924, and received a tombstone promotion to rear admiral when he retired 30 years later.

General Herbert B. Powell later corroborated this account of de facto tombstone promotions during his tenure as acting personnel chief under Army chief of staff Matthew B. Ridgway, recalling that when reviewing a list of brigadier generals who could be promoted to temporary major general, "General Ridgway looked over this list and decided that of the people being retired, he would promote about ten of them, old friends and sons of old friends of his, even though they would hold the rank only three to six months and then they'd be retired."

Repeal

By May 29, 1959, the Navy retired list included 33 admirals, 154 vice admirals, and 1,222 rear admirals who had never served in those grades on active duty, representing 53 percent, 78 percent, and 86 percent, respectively, of all living retirees in those grades. Chief of Naval Personnel Harold Page Smith reported that the Navy was more than halfway through retiring the list of officers eligible for tombstone promotions based on combat citations from World War II, and that the tombstone promotion law would terminate itself when that list was exhausted.

Asked by Senator Howard W. Cannon, a member of the Senate Armed Services Committee and colonel in the Air Force Reserve, whether it would be better to expand tombstone promotions to the Army and Air Force or to eliminate them entirely, Assistant Secretary of Defense for Manpower and Personnel Charles C. Finucane replied that the Department of Defense opposed expanding tombstone promotions, since they devalued higher ranks, but had not pushed to eliminate them because officers had been led to expect them for decades and they would end automatically once every officer with a World War II combat citation had retired. "The Department's position, Senator, is that we do not approve of this, but it is the law."

To the Navy's surprise, Cannon sponsored an amendment to terminate all tombstone promotions on November 1, 1959, which he attached to a bill passed on August 11, 1959, to flatten the hump of excess officers who entered the service during World War II. In ironic contrast to Civil War and World War I hump legislation that created tombstone promotions to encourage voluntary retirement, the World War II hump bill achieved the same incentive by repealing them. About 1,500 officers with the rank of commander or above would lose their tombstone promotions unless they retired by November 1. Fearing a flood of hasty retirements that would wreak havoc with overseas assignments, the Navy lobbied to postpone the deadline until July 2, 1960, but Cannon blocked any extension.

Termination

Tombstone promotions on the basis of combat citations ended on November 1, 1959. The anticipated glut of early retirement applications never materialized. By September 10, 1959, only 29 Navy captains and 12 commanders had asked to retire with a tombstone promotion who would not already have had to retire by the end of the fiscal year anyway.

All five lieutenant generals in the Marine Corps asked to retire a few weeks after the repeal was passed, having been passed over for selection as commandant of the Marine Corps in favor of a major general, David M. Shoup. Lieutenant generals Edwin A. Pollock, Vernon E. Megee, Merrill B. Twining, and Robert E. Hogaboom all retired on November 1 to collect their tombstone promotions to four-star general, but assistant commandant Verne J. McCaul gave up his tombstone promotion to remain on duty until the new commandant took office on January 1, 1960.

Modern examples

Appointments Clause

The President can use his plenary power under the Appointments Clause of the United States Constitution to nominate any officer to be retired in a higher grade, subject to Senate confirmation.

For example, Navy rear admiral John D. Bulkeley served as president of the Board of Inspection and Survey for 21 years, having been retired in 1974 but immediately recalled to active duty, and was advanced to vice admiral on the retired list under the Appointments Clause when he retired permanently in August 1988.

Navy rear admiral Levering Smith served as technical director or program head of the Navy's submarine-launched ballistic missile program for 20 years, having also been retired and recalled to active duty in 1974, and was promoted to vice admiral when he finally stepped down in November 1977.

Service academy permanent professors

Any permanent professor of the U.S. Military Academy or U.S. Air Force Academy whose grade is below brigadier general (all professors except the Dean), and whose service as permanent professor has been long and distinguished, may be retired in the grade of brigadier general at the discretion of the President, but with no increase in pay or allowances. For Air Force Academy professors, the secretary of the Air Force defines "long and distinguished" service to be 30 or more years of total active federal commissioned service and 10 or more years of continuous service as a permanent professor or department head. By 2018, nearly 80 percent of all retired Air Force Academy permanent professors had received a tombstone promotion to brigadier general.

The equivalent of a permanent professor at the U.S. Naval Academy was originally an officer in the Corps of Professors of Mathematics. Like other Navy staff corps officers, professors of mathematics qualified for a tombstone promotion to commodore after 40 years of service. Congress halted appointments to the corps in 1916, and it expired when its last professor retired on July 1, 1936. The tombstone promotion for the defunct corps was repealed by the Officer Personnel Act of 1947, the same law that authorized the tombstone promotion for permanent professors at the Military Academy and later the Air Force Academy. The Naval Academy reestablished a permanent military professor program in 1997, whose officers can remain at the Naval Academy until statutory retirement, like their counterparts at the other two service academies, but do not receive a tombstone promotion.

Assistant judge advocates general of the Navy

Assistant judge advocates general (AJAGs) of the Navy can retire in the grades of rear admiral (lower half) or brigadier general after completing at least one year as AJAG of the Navy, even if serving in lower grades. AJAGs typically never serve in flag or general officer ranks on active duty, but are promoted to those grades at retirement. Their tombstone promotion conferred both the rank and retired pay of a rear admiral (lower half) or brigadier general until 2016, when it was revised by the National Defense Authorization Act for Fiscal Year 2017 (2017 NDAA) to include the rank but not its retired pay.

There are two statutory AJAGs of the Navy, one detailed from the Navy and one from the Marine Corps. The Department of the Navy also has four administratively designated AJAGs: one each for civil law, military justice, and operations and management; and one chief judge of the Navy. Three of the designated AJAGs—civil law, operations and management, and chief judge—are Navy judge advocates serving a three-year tour that includes one year detailed as the Navy's statutory AJAG of the Navy, a rotation that qualifies all three designated AJAGs for the statutory AJAG's tombstone promotion. The designated AJAG for military justice serves as the Marine Corps' statutory AJAG of the Navy for a full three-year tour.

This unusual arrangement stems from the legislative compromise that created the Navy Judge Advocate General's Corps (JAG Corps) in 1967. There were already two statutory flag officer billets for the judge advocate general of the Navy and deputy judge advocate general of the Navy. The House of Representatives passed a bill to establish the JAG Corps with two AJAGs of the Navy in the grades of rear admiral or brigadier general. Navy and Marine Corps line officers immediately protested because flag and general officer billets could only be added to the JAG Corps by subtracting them from somewhere else, due to the so-called "Stennis ceiling" that Senate Armed Services Committee chairman John C. Stennis imposed on the total number of admirals and generals his committee would allow to be confirmed, which was well below any statutory limit. To pass the Senate, the bill was amended to make the AJAG grades optional, permitting but not requiring the President to appoint them as flag or general officers, and to retire them as rear admirals or brigadier generals even if they served in lower grades.

Similar numerical limits on flag officer billets in 2008 led the Navy to establish the position of chief judge of the Navy as a designated AJAG in rotation for a tombstone promotion, rather than the active-duty one-star billet preferred by the study panel that recommended its creation.

National Guard state ranks

Many states allow retiring National Guard officers with enough years of service to request a tombstone promotion to the next higher grade. Such a promotion is sometimes called a "wooden star" because it applies only within the state, and is not federally recognized.

For example, South Carolina National Guard officers and enlisted men are entitled to a one-grade promotion at retirement after completing 20 years of uniformed service, of which the last 10 years must be in the South Carolina National Guard.

After 10 years of active service, Minnesota National Guard officers, warrant officers, and enlisted persons can resign or retire with an honorary brevet commission in the next higher grade, so state adjutant general Richard C. Nash was promoted to brevet lieutenant general when he retired in 2017.

Other examples

Russian Empire
In 1762, Peter III of Russia issued a manifesto to release the Russian nobility from obligatory state service, including a provision that allowed any noble to retire one rank higher in the Table of Ranks if they served at least one year in the previous rank. Although nominally automatic, such promotions could be withheld at the sovereign's discretion, as when Peter III's successor, Catherine the Great, declined to promote a particular major general at retirement on the grounds that "She was above the Laws, and did not choose to grant him this reward."

By the Napoleonic Wars, officers received a one-grade promotion at retirement if they had served at least one year in their current rank, or five years in the case of colonels.

United Kingdom

Royal Navy officers retired with at least the pay of a higher rank as early as 1737, when 30 of the oldest lieutenants were pensioned off with the rank of lieutenant but half-pay of a commander. Starting in 1796, senior lieutenants were retired in batches with both the rank and half-pay of a commander, and in 1830, lieutenants not in those batches were given the option to retire with the rank of commander but half-pay of a lieutenant. Batches of commanders were retired as superannuated captains starting in 1840, and batches of captains as superannuated rear admirals starting in 1846, in order to clear the active list of ancient veterans of the Napoleonic Wars.

The Royal Navy equivalent of a tombstone admiral was called a yellow admiral: a captain who retired with a commission as superannuated rear admiral that entitled him to the half-pay of a rear admiral but no further promotion or employment. Flag officers were divided by seniority into red, white, and blue squadrons until 1864, but a superannuated rear admiral was appointed without distinction of squadron and was sarcastically said to belong to a non-existent yellow squadron. Senior captains were commissioned as the first yellow admirals in 1747 so that more employable captains could be promoted past them. During the Napoleonic Wars, a captain had to have commanded a ship of the line in the current war to become an rear admiral on the active list, or in the previous war to retire as a yellow admiral. By 1891, any captain could retire as a rear admiral, or even vice admiral if he had enough years of service.

During the Cold War, it was customary for the professional heads of the British Army, Royal Navy, and Royal Air Force to be promoted to the five-star ranks of field marshal, admiral of the fleet, or marshal of the Royal Air Force upon completing their terms as chiefs of their respective service staffs, either at retirement or upon elevation to chief of defence staff. Exceptions included first sea lord and chief of naval staff David Luce, who forfeited promotion to admiral of the fleet by resigning to protest the cancellation of the CVA-01 aircraft carrier program in 1966, and chief of general staff Peter Hunt, who declined promotion to field marshal when he retired in 1976 because he had presided over deep cutbacks in Army personnel during his term. End-of-term promotions to five-star ranks were stopped in 1995.

A substantive lieutenant colonel who has held an appointment as equerry to the sovereign for at least five years can retire with the honorary rank of colonel.

Brazil

From the early 1800s, it was standard practice for Brazilian Army officers with at least 30 years of service to retire with the full pay of their highest grade and an honorary brevet, or graduado, promotion to the next higher grade. Officers retiring after 35 years of service received a substantive promotion to the next higher grade and its full pay. By 1925, officers could retire after 30 years with both the brevet rank and retired pay of the next higher grade, after 35 years with substantive promotion to the next higher grade, and after 40 years with substantive promotion to the next higher grade and brevet promotion to the grade above that.

In late 1928, retirement promotions were eliminated for all but the senior officer in each grade, who could retire with a one-grade promotion after 30 years, or a two-grade promotion after 40 years. This triggered a rush of retirement applications from officers with more than 30 years of service, severely depleting senior officer grades to the point that many jobs slated for colonels and lieutenant colonels had to be filled by majors.

Until 1966, the vast majority of Brazilian Army officers received a two-grade promotion at retirement. For example, three-star general de divisão Ademar de Queirós retired as a five-star marechal in November 1963. Army regulations granted one promotion at retirement for each of the following: more than 35 years of service, combat against the Communist uprising of 1935, and participation in World War II. Contemplating a hypothetical three-grade promotion from four-star general de exército, the highest active-duty rank, Army chief of staff Humberto de Alencar Castelo Branco joked, "Perhaps those of us who retire as generais de exército are to become 'Popes'." Castelo Branco called the practice absurd, but it persisted because the only living marechal to hold that rank on active duty, João Baptista Mascarenhas de Morais, had commanded the Brazilian Expeditionary Force during World War II and wanted to preserve tombstone promotions for his former soldiers. By 1971, over one hundred living retirees held the highest rank of marechal, all promoted to that rank at retirement.

Castelo Branco, who was himself advanced to marechal when he retired from the Army the day before being inaugurated President of Brazil on April 15, 1964, ordered an end to tombstone promotions on December 16, 1965, effective October 9, 1966. More than 4,000 commissioned and non-commissioned officers in the Brazilian military elected to keep their tombstone promotions by retiring early.

Pension spiking

A tombstone promotion can also refer to an end-of-career promotion to increase retirement benefits, better known as pension spiking. For example, in 1982 the New Jersey Police and Fireman's Retirement System changed its formula to calculate pensions based on their final year's pay, resulting in a slew of pre-retirement promotions that were estimated to increase average pensions by 10 percent.

See also
List of United States Navy tombstone admirals
List of United States Navy tombstone vice admirals
List of United States Coast Guard tombstone vice admirals
List of United States Marine Corps tombstone lieutenant generals

Notes

References

Military of the United States